Diogo Abreu may refer to:

 Diogo Abreu (geographer) (born 1947), Portuguese geographer
 Diogo Abreu (gymnast) (born 1993), Portuguese trampolinist
 Diogo Abreu (footballer) (born 2003), Portuguese footballer